The following article is a summary of the 2013 football season in Kenya, which is the Golden Jubilee (50th) competitive season in its history.

Domestic leagues

Changes in the football league system

On 10 July, it was announced that the Football Kenya Federation introduced a new league system to take effect from the beginning of the 2014 season. This involved the introduction and scrapping of a few leagues, and the re-organisation of the system.

Promotion and relegation

Promoted to Premier League
 Bandari
 Kakamega Homeboyz

Promoted from Provincial League
 Brighter Stars
 Hotsprings FC
 Jericho AllStars
 Kambakia Christian Centre
 Kisero
 Kisumu Youth Olympic Centre
 Kolongolo
 Maweni City
 Mount Kenya United
 Mumcop
 Murang'a United
 Nakumatt
 Raiders
 St. Joseph
 Suam Orchards
 Tala

Introduced to football league system
 FC Talanta

Relegated from Premier League
 Oserian
 Rangers

Relegated from Division One
 Gatundu Stars
 H.B.C. Mlimani
 Iron Strikers
 Karungu
 KSL Thola Glass
 Yanga

Eliminated from football league system
 Mathare Youth (disbanded)

Team name changes
 Congo JMJ United to FC West Ham United
 Rush to Kakamega Stars to Vihiga Stars
 Nakuru AllStars to Nakuru Top Fry AllStars
 Outgrowers to Busia United Stars
 Rangers to Posta Rangers
 Tala to Mumbi Nationale

Managerial changes

Premier League managerial changes

Division One managerial changes

Premier League

The 2013 Kenyan Premier League season began on 24 February 2013 and is scheduled to end on 9 November 2013, with a break that will last from 26 May 2013 to 23 June 2013.

Division One

The 2013 FKF Division One season began on 23 March and is scheduled to end on 17 November. For this season, all Division One teams endorsed a decision to split both Zone A and Zone B into two groups of 12 teams each, increasing the total number of teams in the league to 48. It was decided that the first group from Zone A comprise teams from the Nairobi, Aberdares and Mount Kenya regions while the second group comprise teams from the Eastern, North and South Coast regions. The first group from Zone B is to comprise teams from the South Nyanza, Central and South Rift regions while the second group comprise teams from the North Nyanza, North Rift and Western regions. Winners from each of these four groups will play the winners from the other group in their zone in a two-legged play-off tie to determine who gains promotion to the Kenyan Premier League for the following season.

On 25 April, the Football Kenya Federation decided to slash the league to 20 teams for the 2014 season. For that to happen, it was decided that the league will consist of top 5 teams in each zone (except the two teams that win the promotion play-offs) in addition to the two relegated Premier League teams. The remaining 29 teams will be relegated to FKF Division Two, which will begin next season, along with the 8 teams promoted from the Provincial League.

Zone A

Zone A – Group 1

Zone A – Group 2

Zone B

Zone B – Group 1

Zone B – Group 2

Promotion play-offs
The promotion play-offs were contested between the winners of each of the 2 groups in both zones, to determine the winners of the zones, who would be consequently promoted to the Premier League. The losers would still gain promotion to the National Super League.

Domestic cups

President's Cup

The 2013 FKF President's Cup began on 20 July ended on 17 November.

Super Cup

During the 2013 season there were 2 Kenyan Super Cup matches held.

Pre-season match

The first 2013 Kenyan Super Cup match was played on 23 February 2013 between Tusker, the 2012 Kenyan Premier League champions, and Gor Mahia, the 2012 FKF President's Cup champions. Gor Mahia won 5–4 on penalties after the match ended 0–0 at full-time.

Post-season match

The second 2013 Kenyan Super Cup match was played on 14 December 2013 between Gor Mahia, the 2013 Kenyan Premier League champions, and Tusker, the 2013 KPL Top 8 Cup champions. Tusker won 5–3 on penalties after the match ended 1–1 at full-time.

Top 8 Cup

The 2013 KPL Top 8 Cup began on 3 April with the quarter-finals and ended on 24 July with the final.

International club competitions

Champions League

The 2013 CAF Champions League began on 15 February 2013 and ended on 10 November 2013. Tusker were representing Kenya in the competition, having won the 2012 Kenyan Premier League.

Preliminary round (CCL)
In the preliminary round, Tusker faced St Michel United, the 2012 Seychelles League champions, and won 7–1 on aggregate over two legs, played on 16 February and 2 March.

First round (CCL)
In the first round, Tusker faced Al-Ahly, who have won the Egyptian Premier League a record 36 times and the CAF Champions League a record 7 times, and lost 4–1 on aggregate over two legs, played on 16 March and 7 April.

Confederation Cup

The 2013 CAF Confederation Cup began on 16 February 2013 and ended on 30 November 2013. Gor Mahia were representing Kenya in the competition, having won the 2012 FKF President's Cup.

Preliminary round (CCC)
In the preliminary round, Gor Mahia faced Anse Réunion, the 2012 Seychelles FA Cup champions, and won 5–0 on aggregate over two legs, played on 16 February and 2 March.

First round (CCC)
In the first round, Gor Mahia faced ENPPI, the 2010–11 Egypt Cup winners, and lost 3–0 on aggregate over two legs, played on 15 March and 6 April.

National teams

Men

World Cup qualification
The national team participated in the second round of World Cup qualifications in Africa. They were eliminated from the competition after losing 1–0 to Nigeria on 5 June.

African Nations Championship qualification
The national team participated in the preliminary round of qualification for the 2014 African Nations Championship. They were eliminated from the competition having lost 1–0 to Burundi on aggregate. The first leg was played on 16 December 2012.

COSAFA Cup

Kenya were invited to participate in the 14th edition of the COSAFA Cup, which is being hosted by Zambia and is scheduled to run from 6 to 20 July. They were eliminated from the competition after losing 2–1 to Botswana on 11 July in the group stage.

†This fixture was originally scheduled to take place on 7 July at 15:00 UTC+2. However, Kenya's arrival at the tournament was delayed due to the players' league commitments.

CECAFA Cup

The 37th edition of the CECAFA Cup was held in Kenya from 27 November to 12 December. The national team was drawn with Ethiopia, South Sudan and Zanzibar in Group A.

Other matches
The following is a list of all other matches played by the Kenya men's team in 2013.

References

External links
Kenyan Premier League
Futaa – Kenyan Football Portal
KenyaFootball
Orange CAN 2013
2014 FIFA World Cup qualifiers – Africa
FIFA.com – Kenya fixtures and results